Janaka Thissakuttiarachchi is a member of the Uva Provincial Council representing the Monaragala District.

References

External links
UVA provincial council opposition claim the majority.
Bio from the Official Parliament Website

1980 births
Living people
Members of the Uva Provincial Council
Members of the 16th Parliament of Sri Lanka